Ian Dowling (born 5 October 1982) is an Irish former rugby union and rugby league player. He played underage and junior club rugby with Kilkenny RFC. He won an All-Ireland League medal with Shannon RFC before joining Munster, with whom he has won two European Rugby Cups both in Cardiff in May 2006 and May 2008. He also has played for the Ireland national rugby league team and Ireland A level. Caretaker Ireland coach Michael Bradley  named him in the Ireland squad for the summer 2008 tour to New Zealand and Australia. Dowling played 27 times in the Heineken Cup for Munster, scoring 5 tries. Dowling won his first cap with the Irish International Rugby Union Team on their 2009 summer tour of North America when he lined out against Canada on 23 May 2009.

Dowling announced in April 2011 that he was retiring from rugby, due to a hip injury, after medical consultation.

"It's been a fabulous experience. I've made some great friends and take with me really great memories, the two Heineken Cup wins obviously the highlights. But besides that, I've had wonderful times with Munster," said Dowling.
Dowling is a qualified physiotherapist by trade and currently works with the Tipperary Senior Football team.

References

External links
Statistics at rugbyleagueproject.org
Munster profile
Ireland profile
Ireland Wolfhounds profile

Ian Dowling In Action for Munster Pictures

1982 births
Living people
Ireland international rugby union players
Ireland national rugby league team players
Ireland Wolfhounds international rugby union players
Irish rugby league players
Irish rugby union players
Munster Rugby players
Rugby league players from County Kilkenny
Rugby union players from County Kilkenny
Shannon RFC players